Bog-e Sagilan (also Romanized as Bog-e Sagīlān; also known as Bog-e Sehgīlān) is a village in Gavkan Rural District, in the Central District of Rigan County, Kerman Province, Iran. At the 2006 census, its population was 47, in 9 families.

References 

Populated places in Rigan County